Midwinter Of The Spirit is a British horror drama television series that was broadcast as three episodes from 23 September 2015 to 7 October 2015, and stars Anna Maxwell Martin, David Threlfall, and Sally Messham.

Plot
The series is based on Phil Rickman's "Merrily Watkins" series of books, of which "Midwinter of the Spirit" is the second in the series. 

This series follows country vicar Merrily Watkins, who is one of the few women priests working as an exorcist in the UK. She is being mentored in the art of exorcism by clergyman Huw Owen, despite warnings from Canon Dobbs. When a grisly murder takes place in her local area, the police come calling for her assistance.

Cast
 Anna Maxwell Martin as Vicar Merrily Watkins
 David Threlfall as Huw Owen
 Sally Messham as Jane Watkins
 Nicholas Pinnock as Bishop Mick Hunter
 Kate Dickie as DCI Annie Howe
 Leila Mimmack as Rowenna Napier
 Siobhan Finneran as Angela Purefoy
 Ania Marson as Mrs. Joy
 Ben Bailey Smith as Lol Robinson
 Will Attenborough as James Lydon
 David Sterne as Canon Dobbs

Production

Development 
The show was filmed in Herefordshire. Cathedral interiors were however filmed in Chester. 

David Threlfall consulted with an exorcist (who author Phil Rickman put him in contact with) for advice on his role.

Episodes

Series 1

Reception

Critical reception
The Daily Telegraph says that it's a "surprisingly faithful adaptation" while being "exceptionally creepy without ever venturing beyond the bounds of the credible". The Guardian newspaper reviewed the show by saying it "is not a slow build", and that "it dives straight in", and it adds that "it’s still a lot of fun, just the thing to both cheer and chill as the nights close in."

References

External links
 
 

2015 British television series debuts
2015 British television series endings
2010s British drama television series
2010s British crime television series
ITV television dramas
2010s British television miniseries
Television series by ITV Studios
English-language television shows
Serial drama television series
Television shows set in Hertfordshire